In 1841, the Bartleson–Bidwell Party, led by Captain John Bartleson and John Bidwell, became the first American emigrants to attempt a wagon crossing from Missouri to California.

Beginnings
In the winter of 1840, the Western Emigration Society was founded in Missouri, with 500 pledging to trek west into Mexican California.  Members included Baldridge, Barnett, Bartleson, Bidwell and Nye.  Organized on 18 May 1841, Talbot H. Green was elected president, John Bidwell secretary, and John Bartleson captain.  The group joined Father Pierre Jean De Smet's Jesuit missionary group, led by Thomas F. Fitzpatrick, westward across South Pass along the Oregon Trail.  That trail took them past Courthouse and Jail Rocks, Chimney Rock, Scotts Bluff, Fort Laramie, and Independence Rock.  The Bartleson-Bidwell party separated from Fitzpatrick, and the missionary group, at Soda Springs on 11 Aug.

The Trail
The western Emigration Society had resolved to follow the route suggested by Dr. John Marsh. As early as 1837, Marsh realized that owning a great rancho was problematic if he could not hold it. The corrupt and unpredictable rulings by courts in California (then part of Mexico) made this questionable. With evidence that the Russians, French and English were preparing to seize the province, he determined to make it a part of the United States. He felt that the best way to go about this was to encourage emigration by Americans to California, and in this way the history of Texas would be repeated.

Marsh conducted a letter-writing campaign espousing the California climate, soil and other reasons to settle there, as well as the best route to follow, which became known as "Marsh's route." His letters were read, reread, passed around, and printed in newspapers throughout the country, and started the first significant immigration to California. He invited immigrants to stay on his ranch until they could get settled, and assisted in their obtaining passports.

Marsh's recommended route, the California Trail, was based on the prior experiences of Jedediah Smith, Peter Skene Ogden, and Joseph R. Walker.  That route led southwest from Soda Springs along the Bear River and the Cache Valley. On August 24, 1841 the party headed west and north around the Great Salt Lake, camping in the vicinity of the Hansel Mountains until September 9 while they scouted the route to Mary's River (known today as the Humboldt River). By September 12 wagons and possessions were beginning to be abandoned. By October 9 they crossed Mary's River and headed west to Lake Humboldt, Humboldt Sink, and Carson Sink. On October 30 they passed through the Stanislaus River canyon into the San Joaquin Valley. On November 4, 1841 the party made it to Marsh's ranch.

According to Doyce Nunis, "...the Bidwell-Bartleson party had successfully made the first planned overland emigrant journey to California, bearing with courage and great fortitude the vicissitudes of their ordeal. These hardy pioneers were the harbingers of many thousands to come."

Roster
Missionary Party
 Captain: Thomas "Broken Hand" Fitzpatrick
 Jesuit Fathers: Pierre-Jean De Smet, Nicholas Point, Gregory Mengarini
 Jesuit Brothers: William Claessens, Charles Huet, Joseph Specht
 Teamsters: L. Boileau, E. Chaussie, L.L. Coving
 Trappers: Jim Baker, John Grey, William Mast, Piga
 Others: Amos E. Frye, Rogers, W.G. Romaine, Reverend Joseph Williams

The Bidwell-Bartleson who arrived in California
 John Bartleson
 Elias Barnett
 Josiah Belden
 William Belty
 John Bidwell
 Henry L. Brolaski
 David W. Chandler
 Joseph Chiles
 Grove C. Cook
 Nicholas Dawson
 V.W. Dawson
 Paul Geddes
 George Henshaw
 Charles Hopper
 Henry Huber
 James John
 Thomas Jones
 Andrew Kelsey
 Benjamin Kelsey
 Nancy Kelsey and daughter
 John McDowell
 Nelson McMahan
 Samuel Green McMahan
 Michael C. Nye
 Andrew Gwinn Patton
 Robert Rickman
 John Roland
 John L. Schwartz
 James P. Springer
 Robert H. Thomas
 Ambrose Walton
 Major Walton
 Charles M. Weber

The Bidwell-Bartleson who arrived in Oregon
 Carroll
 Augustus Fifer
 Richard Fillan with wife and child
 William Fowler
 Charles W. Flügge
 David F. Hill
 J.W. Jones
 Samuel Kelsey with wife and five children
 Zedidiah Kelsey and wife
 Edward Rogers
 James Ross
 Richard Williams and wife

See also 
 Hastings Cutoff

References

 Charles Hopper, "Narrative of Charles Hopper, A California Pioneer of 1841", Utah Historical Quarterly 3 (1930)
 Charles Kelly, Salt Desert Trails (1930)
 Roderick J. Korns, "West from Fort Bridger", Utah Historical Quarterly 19 (1951)
 David E. Miller, First Wagon Train to Cross Utah, 1841", Utah Historical Quarterly 30 (1962)
 Benjamin Kelsey, "Man of Adventurous Disposition"
 Dale L. Morgan, The Great Salt Lake (1947) from Pioneers and Cowboys at historytogo.utah.gov

External links 
 The Westward Migration
 "The First Emigrant Train to California" by John Bidwell

American frontier
Mexican California
Pre-statehood history of Utah
Pre-statehood history of Nevada
Humboldt River
California Trail